Gypsy Girl is a TV series that ran on CITV in early 2001, based on the books The Parsley Parcel and Gold and Silver Water by Elizabeth Arnold. It centred on a gypsy girl (Freya Boswell) and her family, who lived in a typical gypsy caravan on the corner of a typical suburban street. Her great-grandmother was played by Eleanor Bron. She was often called "Gyppo", a derogatory term, by a boy who disliked her.

External links 
IMDB entry

ITV children's television shows